DUX is a scrolling shooter video game developed by independent German studio HUCAST.Net for the Dreamcast. The game was released on July 17, 2009 worldwide.

Gameplay 
Influenced by Gradius and R-Type, DUX is a horizontally scrolling shooter that  relies on tactics rather than fast reflexes. There are several powers the players can use, such as power pod (absorbing bullets while hitting the fire back), charge shot (doing maximum damage blows in a single wave), and onboard missiles (can be fired in any direction around the ship). During the game, the main background can be adjusted in a menu, allowing for a clearer view.

Development
DUX had been in a development delay for almost a year, specifically because of various bugs, one of them allowing a maximum score from the first level. After the players complained about the state of the original game, HUCAST had promised to provide the owners a revised version named DUX 1.5, free of charge.

Legacy 
In May 2012, a Kickstarter project for a remake of the game was announced. It was called Redux: Dark Matters and scheduled for a release on PSN, XBLA, Steam and iOS, as well as the Dreamcast.  The latter version was originally available only as a Kickstarter reward but Redux 1.1 was later sold separately.
The project reached its funding goal of  $25,000 on 14 May 2012, after only a few days. The Dreamcast version was released on January 27, 2014.

References

2009 video games
Dreamcast games
Dreamcast homebrew games
Horizontally scrolling shooters
Dreamcast-only games
Video games developed in Germany
Single-player video games